The 1978 U.S. Clay Court Championships was a combined men's and women's tennis tournament that was held at the Indianapolis Racquet Club in Indianapolis in the United States and played on outdoor clay courts. It was the 10th edition of the tournament in the Open Era and was held from August 7 through August 13, 1978. First-seeded Jimmy Connors won the men's singles title and the accompanying $24,000 first-prize money, while college amateur Dana Gilbert took the women's championship.

Finals

Men's singles

 Jimmy Connors defeated  José Higueras 7–5, 6–1

Women's singles

 Dana Gilbert defeated  Viviana González 6–2, 6–3

Men's doubles

 Hank Pfister /  Gene Mayer defeated  Jeff Borowiak /  Chris Lewis 6–3, 6–1

Women's doubles

 Helena Anliot /  Helle Sparre-Viragh defeated  Barbara Hallquist /  Sheila McInerney 6–3, 6–1

References

External links 
 ATP tournament profile
 ITF tournament details (men's)
 ITF tournament details (women's)

 
U.S. Clay Court Championships
U.S. Clay Court Championships
U.S. Clay Court Championships
U.S. Clay Court Championships